Valér Švec (born 20 July 1935) was a Slovak football player and coach. He played for FC Spartak Trnava.

He coached Spartak Trnava, Inter Bratislava, Zbrojovka Brno, Tatran Prešov, Slovan Bratislava, FC Nitra and
AEL Limassol.

References

1935 births
Living people
Czechoslovak football managers
Slovak football managers
Slovak expatriate football managers
ŠK Slovan Bratislava managers
FC Zbrojovka Brno managers
AEL Limassol managers
FC Spartak Trnava managers
Slovak footballers
Czechoslovak footballers
FC Spartak Trnava players
FK Inter Bratislava managers
Expatriate football managers in Cyprus
Czechoslovak expatriate sportspeople in Cyprus
FC Nitra managers
1. FC Tatran Prešov managers
Association football forwards